The Naked Vicar Show is a satirical Australian radio and television series. The classic Australian sitcom Kingswood Country was spawned from sketches in the series.

Production
The series was written and produced by Gary Reilly and Tony Sattler and made by their company RS Productions for ABC Radio's Double J, (later Triple J when the station changed from AM to FM), before making a record titled The Naked Vicar Show in 1975 (containing highlights from season 1) and being adapted successfully for television by Channel Seven. The series premiered in 1977 and ended in 1978. The stars also performed a live cabaret season of the show during 1976.

Radio
 Season 1 March 21 - 13 June 1976 (13 x 30 mins)
 Season 2 7 November 1976 - 20 March 1977 (13 x 30 mins)
 Special - "The Vicar's Birthday Party" 11 July 1982 (60 mins) Broadcast live from the Sydney Opera House

Television
 Season 1 26 May 1977 - 1 November 1977 (13 x 50 mins)
 Season 2 14 February 1978 - 25 October 1978 (8 x 50 mins)

Cast
The series starred comedy actress Noeline Brown (who had come to fame on The Mavis Bramston Show), veteran announcer Kevin Golsby and actor-comedian Ross Higgins, with a supporting cast including Colin McEwan, Julie McGregor and Laurel McGowan.

Discography

Studio albums

References

Australian television sketch shows
Australian satirical television shows
Seven Network original programming
1977 Australian television series debuts
1978 Australian television series endings
English-language television shows